Tunggiya (Manchu: , Chinese: 佟佳) is the name of a Manchu clan.

Notable figures

Males
Yangzhen (養真/养真; d. 1621), grandfather of Empress Xiaokangzhang
Tulai (圖賴/图赖; 1606–1658), a first rank military official (都統/都统) and a first class duke (一等公)
Guowei (國維/国维; d. 1719), a first rank military official (領侍衛內大臣/领侍卫内大臣) in the Ministry of Internal Affairs (内务府) and a first class duke (一等公),father of Empress Xiaoyiren
Yekeshu (叶克书), father of Shun'anyan
Dekesi (德克新), served as third class imperial guard
Hongshan (洪善)
Qingyuan (庆元)
Qingfu (庆復; d. 1747), served as first rank military official (都統/都统, pinyin: dutong) from 1727 to 1733, Viceroy of Liangjiang, Viceroy of Yunnan, Viceroy of Liangguang in 1741, a Grand Secretary of Wenhua hall (文华殿大学士)
 Longkodo (d. 1728), an eminent and powerful minister during the reigns of the Kangxi Emperor and Yongzheng Emperor
 Shun'anyan (d. 1724), Longkodo's nephew
 Huase (花色)
 Shuming'a (舒明阿), the Magistrate of Yong'an from 1771 to 1772 and the Magistrate of Xin'an County from 1776 to 1777, and a first class duke (一等公), father of Empress Xiaoshencheng
 Yuxiang (裕祥)
 Qingshan (庆山)

 Prince Consort

Females
Imperial Consort
 Empress
 Empress Xiaokangzhang (1638–1663), the Shunzhi Emperor's concubine, the mother of the Kangxi Emperor (1654–1722)
 Empress Xiaoyiren (d. 1689), the Kangxi Emperor's third empress, the mother of eighth daughter (1683)
 Empress Xiaoshencheng (1792–1833), the Daoguang Emperor's first empress, the mother of Princess Duanmin (1813–1819)
 Imperial Noble Consort
 Imperial Noble Consort Quehui (1668–1743), the Kangxi Emperor's noble consort
 Imperial Noble Consort Duanke (1844–1910), the Xianfeng Emperor's imperial concubine

Princess Consort
 Primary Consort
 Hahana Jacing (1560–1592), Nurhaci's first primary consort, the mother of Princess Duanzhuang (1578–1652), Cuyen (1580–1615) and Daišan (1583–1648)
 Šurhaci's first primary consort, the mother of Altungga (1580–1609)
 Dorgon's second primary consort
 Secondary Consort
 Dodo's secondary consort, the mother of Cani (1641–1688), Dongge (1647–1706) and Princess
 Concubine
 Dodo's concubine, the mother of Fiyanggū (1649–1723)

Gallery

References

Manchu clans
Qing dynasty people
Bordered Yellow Banner